Štefan Svitek (born 20 November 1966 in Gelnica) is a Slovak former professional basketball player and coach. During his playing career, at a height of 2.04 m (6'8 ") tall, he played at the power forward position.

Playing career

Club career
During his pro career, Svitek won the German Cup in 1994, the Austrian Cup in 2001, and the Slovak League championship in 2007. He was also named the Slovak Player of the Year, in 2003.

National team career
Svitek was a member of the senior Czechoslovakian national basketball team. With Czechoslovakia, he played at the 1987 EuroBasket, and at the 1991 EuroBasket.

Coaching career
Svitek was the head coach of the senior Hungarian women's national team, which he coached at the EuroBasket Women 2017.

References

External links
FIBA Profile

1966 births
Living people
Slovak basketball coaches
Slovak men's basketball players
People from Gelnica
Sportspeople from the Košice Region
Power forwards (basketball)
Traiskirchen Lions players